Exercise Cambrian Patrol is an annual international military exercise that involves its participating units covering a 40-mile (65 km) course in less than 48 hrs while performing numerous types of military maneuvers and patrols placed throughout the rugged  Cambrian Mountains and swamp lands of mid-Wales.

Cambrian Patrol was first set up in August 1960 by Welshman Major General Lewis Pugh DSO, to feature long distance marching over the Cambrian Mountains from Tonfanau on the west coast of Wales. Since then, the exercise has been rigorously updated to meet the challenges faced by modern soldiers. 

In 2006 the event which ran from 27 October to 5 November 2006, attracted 95 teams from the British Army (regular and territorial) and Royal Air Force. Foreign army teams from Pakistan, Canada, Lithuania, Latvia, Denmark, India, France and the Czech Republic also took part. A total of 64 teams completed the exercise. 

The competition consists of teams of eight men or women patrolling across difficult terrain. It's a test of leadership, self-discipline, courage, physical endurance and determination. The exercise usually starts with teams arriving at a rendezvous before having their equipment checked to make sure they have everything required. Missing equipment will be replaced by dead weight and will mean points will be deducted. From there the team leader will be taken to orders while the rest of the team set up a quick hide, start their battle prep and prepare to receive orders i.e. prepare a model of the ground which will be covered during the patrol.  Many of the teams that enter do not finish, those that do earn one of four distinctions; gold medal, silver medal, bronze medal, or passing.

References

External links
 Exercise Cambrian Patrol 2019 

Cambrian Patrol
Cambrian Patrol
Military history of Wales
Cambrian Patrol
Annual events in the United Kingdom